Whitley Preceptory was a priory in North Yorkshire, England.

It is known to have been in the possession of the Templars by 1248, but was probably in use before that time. Sometime between 1308 and 1312, the preceptory was abandoned after the suppression of the Knights Templar.

As the site cannot be positively identified, some have suggested the manor was in Weedley, a deserted medieval village in the East Riding of Yorkshire.

References

Monasteries in North Yorkshire